The Genocides is a 1965 science fiction novel   by American author Thomas M. Disch. It was nominated for the Nebula Award for Best Novel in 1965.

Plot summary
The Genocides describes the genocide of humans by aliens who seed Earth with enormous Plants. The Plants are massive and rapidly out-compete terrestrial flora, forming a monoculture. They appear unwholesome to the native fauna, and the extinction of all Earthly life seems inevitable.

The novel opens with a small rural community struggling for survival on the border of Lake Superior, a few years after the coming of the Plants and the collapse of civilization. The community, led by Anderson and his family, eke out an existence by siphoning sap from the Plants to irrigate their corn crop. Anderson is a conservative and religious man, harsh and uncompromising, but he has managed to keep his people alive and focused on survival. His rules include hostility to outsiders, who are routinely killed unless they are of use to the community.

Elsewhere, a group of vagrants encounter spherical machines that are incinerating every trace of humanity left on Earth. Fleeing the machines, the group runs afoul of Anderson's community, who kill all but two of their number: Jeremiah Orville, a mining engineer, and Alice Nemerov, a nurse. The novel implies that the dead are ground into sausage meat and consumed. Jeremiah assimilates into the community, but secretly plots revenge on Anderson and his family. In the process, he courts Anderson's thirteen-year-old daughter, Blossom, and befriends Anderson's educated son, Buddy.

During the harsh winter, the spherical machines arrive to incinerate the community, and Jeremiah sees his revenge coming to fruition. Most of the community is slaughtered by the machines, and the few who survive the initial conflagration flee into a cave. There, they discover the Plants' roots are hollow and form a massive and interlocking underground network. Jeremiah suggests they go deeper, pointing out that they will be able to escape the winter (and the machines) underground.

Deep underground, they discover the "fruit" of the plants is housed in the root system: a nutritious pulp that sustains the community for weeks.  Anderson, who lost his wife Lady when fleeing, becomes upset by the increasing indolence of his people, as his harsh rules are no longer required for survival. When he is bitten by a rat, gangrene sets in and he declines quickly. Anderson's final words to his brutish son, Neil, are to let Jeremiah take over as leader and to allow Jeremiah to marry Blossom.  This decision angers Neil, and he murders Anderson, as well as Alice when she discovers evidence of his act. Neil then assumes leadership, but proves too unintelligent to manage the group, and the community breaks up.

In the aftermath, Jeremiah goes in search of Blossom, planning to kill her and complete his revenge, but when he finds her, he experiences a change of heart and falls in love. They decide to return to the others, but discover Neil has sabotaged their escape - and, inadvertently, his own. Neil, Jeremiah, Blossom, and Buddy try to find their way back together, but the Plants' tunnel network suddenly floods with sap, and they become lost and exhausted. Neil turns against the group, but is overcome and abandoned in the dark.

When the three survivors finally return to the diminished group, they find machines have come to harvest the Plants' crop.  Without the pulp to live on, the group returns to the surface, where they discover that a new crop of Plants has been sown by the mysterious aliens. The malnourished group has no chance of survival, and the novel closes on Jeremiah and Blossom leaving them to travel into the wilderness.  The pair, starving and mismatched in age, are portrayed as a distorted mirror image of the biblical Adam and Eve and herald the end of humanity instead of the beginning.

Writing style
Disch primarily uses the third person limited, changing the narration to follow different characters at different times.  Most of the main characters are given the point of view at various times, including the mysterious aliens.  The conclusion of the novel is in third person omniscient.

Inspiration and allusions
Disch claimed no direct inspiration for The Genocides, but stated in an interview that he was reading Anna Karenina when he wrote the novel and was inspired by Tolstoi's writing.

The Genocides makes many allusions to the Old Testament.  The end of the story mirrors the story of Adam and Eve.  The character Jeremiah Orville's name is biblical and refers to the prophet Jeremiah.  Both witness the destruction of a city.

The Greek myth of the lotus-eaters is made reference to when some of the characters become complacent with eating the fruit pulp of the plant which appears to have a mildly narcotic effect.  One character even becomes addicted to the pulp and grows to massive proportions.

Reception
The Genocides was positively received by many, although Algis Budrys attacked the novel as pretentious. Brian W. Aldiss singled it out for praise in a long review in SF Impulse, noting in particular that Disch's treatment of the Plants as "majestic indeed . . . as credible a menace as I ever came on." Algis Budrys, noting sharply divided opinion in the sf community over its merits, concluded that The Genocides, "in being so unflaggingly derivative of an emerging mode [of sf, regarding human significance], and in having been effective nevertheless to have so much good opinion behind it, . . . demonstrates the vitality and strength of that mode whether you like it or not."
The novel was nominated for a Nebula Award in 1965, but did not receive one.

References

Sources
 

1965 American novels
1965 science fiction novels
American post-apocalyptic novels
American science fiction novels
Novels by Thomas M. Disch
Berkley Books books
1965 debut novels